Ikenna Stars Academy is a government-approved school located in Igbede, a community in Ojo local government area of Lagos State.

History
Ikenna Stars Academy was established by Eze Ikenna Onuegbu in 2004 as a co- educational primary and secondary school with an initial intake of about 28 pioneer students and six experienced teachers. The school is a co-educational boarding and day school for children aged from 2 to 19 years or above.

Ikenna Stars Academy is renowned for its dominance in major inter-school sports competitions in Ojo and its environs.

See also

 List of schools in Lagos

References

Secondary schools in Lagos State
2004 establishments in Nigeria
Schools in Lagos
Educational institutions established in 2004
Primary schools in Nigeria